Cor Veldhoen (6 April 1939 – 11 October 2005) was a Dutch footballer who was active as a defender. Veldhoen played his whole professional career at Feijenoord and won 27 caps for the Netherlands.

Honours
 1960-61 : Eredivisie winner with Feijenoord
 1961-62 : Eredivisie winner with Feijenoord
 1964-65 : Eredivisie winner with Feijenoord
 1964-65 : KNVB Cup winner with Feijenoord
 1968-69 : Eredivisie winner with Feijenoord
 1969-70 : European Cup winner with Feijenoord

References

 Profile

External link

1939 births
2005 deaths
Dutch footballers
Feyenoord players
Eredivisie players
Footballers from Rotterdam
Netherlands international footballers
Association football defenders